The Old Deerfield Center Historic District is an area in the New Hampshire town of Deerfield; it was listed on the National Register of Historic Places in 2020.

Description and history
Old Deerfield Center was originally part of adjacent Nottingham, which was incorporated in 1722. Properties within the district include several Georgian Colonial homes and four Greek Revival homes. Also included is the Old Center Cemetery, where Major John Simpson of the American Revolutionary War is buried.

See also
National Register of Historic Places listings in Rockingham County, New Hampshire

References

Further reading

Greek Revival architecture in New Hampshire
Historic districts in Rockingham County, New Hampshire
Historic districts on the National Register of Historic Places in New Hampshire
National Register of Historic Places in Rockingham County, New Hampshire
Deerfield, New Hampshire